Marble Ass is a 1995 feature film by Serbian filmmaker Želimir Žilnik. It was screened at the Berlin Film Festival in 1995 and won a Teddy award as best feature. It was screened at many worldwide festivals besides Berlin including the Toronto Film Festival, Montreal, San Francisco and Moscow. To celebrate the 30th anniversary of the Teddy Awards, the film has been selected to be shown at the 66th Berlin International Film Festival in February 2016.

References

External links
 

1995 films
Serbian LGBT-related films
1990s war comedy-drama films
Films directed by Želimir Žilnik
Serbian war comedy-drama films
Cross-dressing in film
Films set in Serbia
1995 comedy films
1995 drama films
1995 LGBT-related films
1990s Serbian-language films